Lyon - La Duchère (formerly AS Lyon Duchère and Sporting Club de Lyon) is a French association football team founded in 1964 as Lyon Duchère Association Sportive and based in the La Duchère district of Lyon, France. It took its current name in June 2021 in a rebranding exercise to focus on the origin of the club, after a year-long spell without Duchère as part of the name. It currently plays in the Championnat National 2, the fourth tier in the French football league system. It plays at the Stade de Balmont in Lyon, which has a capacity of 5,600.

History

Coupe de France success
Lyon Duchère have achieved success in France's most prestigious cup competition, the Coupe de France. They reached the Round of 16 twice in 2006 defeating two Ligue 1 sides in the process and in 2019. They have also reached the Round of 32 on three occasions, in 1995, 2007, and 2008.

Championnat National
Lyon Duchère competed in the Championnat National for the first time in the 2016–17 season. They had a relatively successful first season finishing in 7th position with 50 points. They were only four points away from qualifying to the Ligue 2. They looked set for promotion until they lost their last three games of the season. They competed in  the Championnat National again in the 2017–18 season.

SC Lyon rebrand
In May 2019 the club held a poll of supporters to choose one of three new names. On 4 June 2020, it announced that the name Sporting Club de Lyon had been chosen, in order to appeal to a larger number of people from across the city.

Lyon La Duchère rebrand
A year later, after finishing last in the 2020–21 Championnat National, new president Jean-Christophe Vincent announced a rebrand of the club, in order to "turn the page on a sporting failure" and "return to the original identity of the club... [and] take a name that clearly recalls the origin and the raison d'être of this football club". The announcement was made on 1 June 2021.

Current squad

First team

Reserve team

References

External links
 

Football clubs in Lyon
Association football clubs established in 1964
1964 establishments in France